Gary Dontzig is an American television producer, screenwriter, and actor. He worked as a writer/producer for television programs including Murphy Brown, Suddenly Susan and Becker. He and his writing partner Steven Peterman wrote for the second season of W.I.T.C.H. who were hired by their long time friend and neighbor, Greg Weisman.

Dontzig won two Primetime Emmy Awards and three nominations in the categories Outstanding Comedy Series and Outstanding Writing for a Comedy Series from 1991 to 1993.

References

External links

Living people
Year of birth missing (living people)
American screenwriters
American male television writers
American male screenwriters
American television producers
American male television actors
Primetime Emmy Award winners